Luiz Felipe de Oliveira Nasr (born 21 August 1992) is a Brazilian racing driver. He is the 2018 IMSA Sportscar champion and won the 2019 12 Hours of Sebring.

After a year as the official test driver for Williams in 2014, he joined Sauber as a full-time Formula One driver in 2015. However, from the 2017 season he was replaced by Pascal Wehrlein.

From 2018, Nasr has been competing in the IMSA WeatherTech SportsCar Championship for Whelen Engineering Racing, winning the championship with co-driver Eric Curran in his first year in the series and winning another title with countryman Pipo Derani in 2021.

For 2022, Nasr was named a Porsche factory driver.

Career

Karting
Born in Brasília, Distrito Federal, Nasr began karting in Brazil when he was seven years old. Between 2000 and 2007 he won several championship titles in Brazil.

Formula BMW
2008
Nasr made his open-wheel racing debut in the final round of the 2008 Formula BMW Americas season at Interlagos, which supported the 2008 Brazilian Grand Prix, claiming a podium finish in the second race in a championship that was dominated by Alexander Rossi.

2009
Nasr moved to the European championship of Formula BMW in 2009 for EuroInternational. He finished 14 of the 16 races in the top two, won 6 races, 5 pole-positions and claimed the title by 104 points from teammate Daniel Juncadella. As the championship was held by BMW, linked to Sauber in that season, Nasr was called to test a Sauber F1 car, but with BMW leaving F1, the test did not happen.

Formula Three
2010
For the 2010, Nasr moved into the British Formula 3 Championship with Räikkönen Robertson Racing, joining a three-car team alongside the team's 2009 drivers Carlos Huertas and Daisuke Nakajima. In addition to signing for the team, Nasr signed to Robertson Management, the organisation that manages the career of former Formula One world champion Kimi Räikkönen. Nasr finished the 2010 British Formula 3 season in 5th position.

2011
Nasr signed with Carlin Motorsport for the 2011 Championship and won the Sunoco Rolex 24 at Daytona Challenge, a special joint racing programme among series in the United Kingdom that use Sunoco Racing Fuel. The winner of that challenge won a drive in the 2012 Rolex 24 at Daytona. He was third in the Daytona 24 Hour.
Nasr claimed the title of the 2011 British Formula 3 season, 123 points ahead of his teammate, Kevin Magnussen.

In the 2012 Rolex 24 at Daytona, Nasr finished third overall and in class, driving a second generation Riley prototype for Michael Shank Racing.

GP2 Series

2012
Nasr signed with DAMS to race in the 2012 GP2 Series season with the support of Brazilian sponsors Banco do Brasil and Eike Batista's OGX. Nasr's best results were a 2nd place in Race 2 of the Belgian round and a 4th place in Race 1 of the German round. He was teamed with the experienced Davide Valsecchi, who won the drivers' championship; Nasr's tenth place in the standings meant DAMS won the teams' championship as well. He took four podium finishes, with a best finish of second at Spa, and was the second highest-placed rookie overall, behind James Calado.

2013
For the 2013 GP2 Series season Nasr moved to Carlin, partnering British Jolyon Palmer. Nasr believed that he would be a title contender, alongside James Calado and Marcus Ericsson, and hoped to be driving an F1 car at the end of the year. Nasr finished the 2013 campaign 4th overall in the standings.

2014
Nasr remained with Carlin for the 2014 season, partnering Colombian Julián Leal. He took his first GP2 win in the sprint race in Barcelona. He achieved wins at the Red Bull Ring, Silverstone, and Spa-Francorchamps. Throughout the season, he was involved in a fight for the championship with former teammate Jolyon Palmer, losing out in Russia. Nasr finished third overall, after losing second place by five points, to rookie Stoffel Vandoorne at Yas Marina.

Formula One
2014
It was confirmed on 22 February 2014 that Nasr would be joining Williams as the team's reserve driver, participating in three tests and five free practice sessions across the course of the season. He made his first appearance in first practice in the  replacing Valtteri Bottas.

Sauber (2015–2016)

In his first race with the team in Australia, Nasr finished in fifth position, the highest placing for a Brazilian driver making a Grand Prix début.
His finishing streak ended at the  when his gearbox failed on the way to the grid. In Japan, for the first time, he failed to finish, as he had a mechanical failure on lap 51; he was classified in 20th place. Nasr finished his début season with 27 points, finishing 13th in the drivers' championship. After a successful 2015 season, Sauber retained Nasr for 2016.

Nasr's—and Sauber's—only points in 2016 came at the Brazilian Grand Prix, where he finished ninth. The finish allowed Sauber to overtake Manor in the constructors' championship, which cost the latter team prize money and eventually led to Manor's bankruptcy. For the 2017 season, Nasr was due to swap places with Manor driver Pascal Wehrlein, but Nasr was left without a drive due to Manor's exit from the sport which he had ironically caused by his own racing.

Formula E

In January 2019, Nasr joined GEOX Dragon for the rookie test in Marrakesh, but was unable to participate due to contractual issues. The following month, it was announced Nasr would replace Maximilian Günther from the Mexico City ePrix onwards. Because of Nasr's IMSA commitments, Günther had temporarily returned to his seat at the 2019 Rome ePrix. He made his debut at the 2019 Mexico City ePrix where he finished in 19th place, having run at the back of the pack for the majority of the race. At his second race in Hong Kong, he crashed his car into the wall early in the race, taking out the two Mahindra cars of Pascal Wehrlein & Jerome d'Ambrosio in the process. At his third race in Sanya he stalled on the grid & recorded his second successive DNF. Nasr has not returned to Formula E since, ending his run at three consecutive races with one non-points finish and two DNFs, as the team opted to continue using Günther moving forward. He was classified 24th overall in the championship, tied on 0 points with Tom Dillmann & Felix Rosenqvist.

IndyCar Series
2020
On 10 March 2020, it was announced Nasr was scheduled to make his IndyCar debut for Carlin at the Firestone Grand Prix of St. Petersburg. However, due to the COVID-19 pandemic, the race was postponed until October, putting his debut on hold. Ultimately, Nasr did not compete in the season.

WeatherTech SportsCar Championship
In July 2020, Nasr tested positive for COVID-19. He missed the round at Daytona but made a full recovery and returned to race at the next round of Sebring, starting from pole position and taking the race victory.

IMSA Career

Since he joined the series back in 2018 he has had 9 wins and 26 podiums  and is entering his 6th season racing in the category.

Personal life
Nasr is of Lebanese ancestry, his grandfather having emigrated to Brazil in the 1960s. Nasr lists his favourite hobbies as sports, fishing and mechanics, he cites the Star Wars and James Bond film series as his favourite films, his favourite driver as Ayrton Senna, and his favourite circuit as Circuit de Spa-Francorchamps. Felipe is the nephew of Amir Nasr, who owns one of the most successful South American Formula Three racing teams that helped with the progression of many Brazilian drivers in junior formulas, such as Hélio Castroneves, Vítor Meira, Antônio Pizzonia, Luciano Burti, Bruno Junqueira, Cristiano da Matta, Mário Haberfeld, Max Wilson, Átila Abreu and Sérgio Jimenez. Nasr's favourite musical artists include Johnny Cash, Bob Dylan and Dire Straits. Nasr is multilingual with the ability to speak Portuguese, English and Italian.

Racing record

Career summary

† – As Nasr was a guest driver, he was ineligible for points.
* Season still in progress.

Complete GP2 Series results
(key) (Races in bold indicate pole position; races in italics indicate fastest lap)

Complete Formula One results
(key) (Races in bold indicate pole position; races in italics indicates fastest lap)

† Did not finish, but was classified as he had completed more than 90% of the race distance.

24 Hours of Daytona results

Complete IMSA SportsCar Championship results

* Season still in progress.

Complete European Le Mans Series results

‡ Half points awarded as less than 75% of race distance was completed.

Complete 24 Hours of Le Mans results

Complete Formula E results
(key) (Races in bold indicate pole position; races in italics indicate fastest lap)

Complete FIA World Endurance Championship results
(key) (Races in bold indicate pole position; races in italics indicate fastest lap)

* Season still in progress.

References

External links

Amir Nasr Racing

1992 births
Living people
Sportspeople from Brasília
Brazilian people of Lebanese descent
Formula BMW USA drivers
Formula BMW Europe drivers
British Formula Three Championship drivers
Formula 3 Euro Series drivers
FIA Formula 3 European Championship drivers
GP2 Series drivers
Brazilian GP2 Series drivers
24 Hours of Daytona drivers
Rolex Sports Car Series drivers
Brazilian Formula One drivers
Sauber Formula One drivers
24 Hours of Le Mans drivers
Brazilian Formula E drivers
Brazilian WeatherTech SportsCar Championship drivers
Formula BMW Pacific drivers
FIA World Endurance Championship drivers
Stock Car Brasil drivers
Sportspeople of Lebanese descent
EuroInternational drivers
Double R Racing drivers
Carlin racing drivers
DAMS drivers
Action Express Racing drivers
Porsche Motorsports drivers
European Le Mans Series drivers
Team Penske drivers
Dragon Racing drivers
Meyer Shank Racing drivers